Centralia is a city in Lewis County, Washington, United States. It is located along Interstate 5 near the midpoint between Seattle and Portland, Oregon. The city had a population of 18,183 at the 2020 census. Centralia is twinned with Chehalis, located to the south near the confluence of the Chehalis and Newaukum rivers.

History
In the 1850s and 1860s, Centralia's Borst Home, at the confluence of the Chehalis and Skookumchuck Rivers, was the site of a toll ferry, and the halfway stopping point for stagecoaches operating between Kalama, Washington and Tacoma. In 1850, J. G. Cochran and his wife Anna were led there via the Oregon Trail by their adopted son, George Washington, a free African-American. The family feared Washington would be forced into slavery if they stayed in Missouri after the passage of the Compromise of 1850. Cochran filed a donation land claim near the Borst Home in 1852 and was able to sell his claim to Washington for $6,000 because unlike the neighboring Oregon Territory, there was no restriction against passing legal ownership of land to African Americans in the newly formed Washington Territory.

Upon hearing of the imminent arrival of the Northern Pacific Railway (NP) in 1872, Washington and his wife, Mary Jane, filed a plat for the town of Centerville, naming the streets after biblical references and offering lots for $10 each, with one lot free to buyers who built houses. Washington also donated land for a city park, a cemetery, and a Baptist church. Responding to new settlers' concern about a town in Klickitat County with the same name, the town was renamed Centralia by 1883, as suggested by a recent settler from Centralia, Illinois, and officially incorporated on February 3, 1886. The town's population boomed, then collapsed in the Panic of 1893, when the NP went bankrupt; entire city blocks were offered for as little as $50 with no takers. Washington (despite facing racial prejudice from some newcomers) made personal loans and forgave debt to keep the town afloat until the economy stabilized; the city then boomed again based on the coal, lumber and dairying industries. When Washington died in 1905, all businesses in the town closed, and 5,000 mourners attended his funeral.

The boom lasted until November 11, 1919, when the infamous Centralia Massacre occurred. Spurred on by local lumber barons, American Legionnaires (many of whom had returned from WWI to find their jobs filled by pro-union members of the Industrial Workers of the World (IWW)), used the Armistice Day parade to attack the IWW hall. Marching unarmed, the Legionnaires broke from the parade and stormed the hall in an effort to bust union organizing efforts by what was seen to be a Bolshevik-inspired labor movement. IWW workers including recently returned WWI veteran Wesley Everest, stood their ground, engaged and killed four Legionnaires. Everest was captured, jailed and then brutally lynched. Other IWW members were also jailed. The event made international headlines, and coupled with similar actions in Everett, Washington and other lumber towns, stifled the American labor movement until the economic devastation of the 1930s Great Depression changed opinions about labor organizations.

The town's name was originally a reference to the town's location as the midway point between Tacoma and Kalama (which were originally the NP's Washington termini), but proved to have longevity when it became the midpoint between Seattle and Portland, Oregon as well during the development of Washington's I-5 portion of the Interstate Highway System. As extractive industries faced decline, Centralia's development refocused on freeway oriented food, lodging, retail and tourism, as well as regional shipping and warehousing facilities, leading to 60 percent growth in population over the past four decades.

Economy and employment
Founded as a railroad town, Centralia's economy was originally dependent on such extractive industries as coal, lumber and agriculture. At one time, five railroad lines crossed in Centralia, including the Union Pacific Railroad, Northern Pacific Railway, Milwaukee Road, Great Northern Railroad and a short line.

The construction of Interstate 5 and its predecessor, U.S. Route 99, made Centralia the halfway point for motorists traveling between Seattle and Portland.

The explosion of Mount St. Helens on May 18, 1980, devastated the local lumber industry, as 12 million board feet of stockpiled lumber and 4 billion board feet of salable timber was damaged or destroyed. Unemployment surged to double digits, and the town lost most of its retail base.

In 1988, London Fog opened the first factory outlet store in the Northwest, choosing the location because it was the midpoint between major northwest cities. Their success spawned the region's first factory outlet center, creating a tourist shopping destination. This led in turn to the redevelopment of the vintage downtown marketplace as an antique, art and specialty store destination.

Chehalis Mints was founded in the city in 1994 and produces various mint and mint chocolate candies, with a specialty in butter mints. The company's products are sold primarily in the Pacific Northwest.

On November 28, 2006, it was announced that TransAlta Corp., the largest employer in Centralia and operator of the Centralia Coal Mine and Centralia Power Plant, would eliminate 600 coal mining jobs.
Despite fears to the contrary, there has been little noticeable economic effect upon the City of Centralia as a result. Data indicates that Centralia is experiencing growth both in its light industrial areas as well as its core business district, historic downtown Centralia. Additional development of regional distribution and transportation facilities, along with in-migration from retirees from more populated counties to the north, have helped diversify the economy, though unemployment remains stubbornly high and per-capita income well below the state average.

Geography

Climate
This region experiences warm (but not hot) and dry summers, with no average monthly temperatures above 71.6 °F. According to the Köppen Climate Classification system, Centralia has a warm-summer Mediterranean climate, abbreviated "Csb" on climate maps. Temperatures are usually quite mild, although Centralia is generally warmer in the summer and colder in the winter than locations further north along the Puget Sound.

Demographics

2010 census
As of the census of 2010, there were 16,336 people, 6,640 households, and 3,867 families residing in the city. The racial makeup of the city was 85.1% White, 0.6% African American, 1.4% Native American, 1.0% Asian, 0.3% Pacific Islander, 7.4% from other races, and 4.1% from two or more races. Hispanic or Latino people of any race were 16.1% of the population.

There were 6,640 households, of which 31.6% had children under the age of 18 living with them, 37.7% were married couples living together, 14.4% had a female householder with no husband present, 6.1% had a male householder with no wife present, and 41.8% were non-families. 33.8% of all households were made up of individuals, and 15.8% had someone living alone who was 65 years of age or older. The average household size was 2.41 and the average family size was 3.06.

The median age in the city was 34.8 years. 24.7% of residents were under the age of 18; 10.7% were between the ages of 18 and 24; 25.7% were from 25 to 44; 22.3% were from 45 to 64; and 16.6% were 65 years of age or older. The gender makeup of the city was 48.3% male and 51.7% female.

2000 census
As of the census of 2000, there were 14,742 people, 5,943 households, and 3,565 families residing in the city. The population density was 1,990.6 people per square mile (768.1/km). There were 6,510 housing units at an average density of 879.0 per square mile (339.2/km). The racial makeup of the city was 89.76% White, 0.44% African American, 1.25% Native American, 0.94% Asian, 0.30% Pacific Islander, 4.94% from other races, and 2.38% from two or more races. Hispanic or Latino people of any race were 10.22% of the population.

There were 5,943 households, out of which 29.4% had children under the age of 18 living with them, 41.7% were married couples living together, 13.0% had a female householder with no husband present, and 40.0% were non-families. 32.7% of all households were made up of individuals, and 16.9% had someone living alone who was 65 years of age or older. The average household size was 2.40 and the average family size was 3.02.

In the city, the population was spread out, with 25.2% under the age of 18, 10.5% from 18 to 24, 25.7% from 25 to 44, 19.4% from 45 to 64, and 19.2% who were 65 years of age or older. The median age was 37 years. For every 100 females, there were 89.8 males. For every 100 females age 18 and over, there were 86.6 males.

The median income for a household in the city was $30,078, and the median income for a family was $35,684. Males had a median income of $31,595 versus $22,076 for females. The per capita income for the city was $16,305. About 13.6% of families and 18.0% of the population were below the poverty line, including 24.4% of those under age 18 and 10.8% of those age 65 or over.

Government and politics
Centralia is a noncharter code city with a council–manager form of government. The City Council consists of seven members with positions one through three being at-large positions.

Although slightly less so than Lewis County as a whole, Centralia is conservative and leans Republican.

Media
Centralia's leading newspaper is The Chronicle, ranked seventeenth in the state based on weekday circulation, and serves most of Lewis County. There are also several community-based newspapers that are published bi-weekly, such as The Lewis County News and The East County Journal.

Radio
AM radio
 KELA - 1470 AM
 KITI - 1420 AM

FM radio
 KCED - 91.3 FM
 KMNT - 104.3 FM
 KACS - 90.5 FM
 KITI-FM - 95.1 FM
 KZTM - 102.9 FM

Education

Centralia College

Centralia College is the oldest continuously operating junior college in the state of Washington, and was founded on September 14, 1925.

Culture
Seattle-based rock band Harvey Danger used Centralia as a metaphor in its song "Moral Centralia," found on the 2005 album Little by Little.

Local landmarks

 Borst Home: A historic home built in 1864 at the site of the toll ferry crossing at the confluence of the Chehalis and Skookumchuck rivers by Joseph Borst, an Oregon Trail migrant.
 The Carnegie Library is located in Washington Park and was originally built in 1913 followed by a remodel in 1977–78. The library is now part of the Timberland Regional Library system.
 Centralia Square: The former Elks Lodge, built in 1929 and restored in 2015. It includes a 9-room boutique hotel with ballroom, two restaurants and the town's original antique mall.
 Centralia Union Depot was built in 1912 and features red brick architecture, vintage oak benches, and internal and external woodworking throughout. The renovated depot is currently served by Amtrak and Twin Transit.
 Fox Theater: A historic movie theater opened in 1930 and seats 1,200 people.
 McMenamin's Olympic Club Hotel & Theater: a historic hotel and restaurant that opened in 1908 and was renovated in 1913.

Public art
Murals are found throughout historic downtown Centralia. Examples include murals depicting the founder of Centralia (Centerville) named George Washington, Buffalo Bill and his Wild West Show and an abstract mural depicting the 1919 Armistice Day Centralia Massacre, also known as the Wobbly War.

Notable people
 Charlie Albright, pianist
 Calvin Armstrong, American football player
 Ann Boleyn, singer
 Bob Coluccio, baseball player
 Merce Cunningham, modern dancer
 Noah Gundersen, singer
 Soren Johnson, video game designer
 James Kelsey, sculptor
 Craig McCaw, entrepreneur
 Angela Meade, operatic soprano
 C.D. Moore, U.S. Air Force general
 Patricia Anne Morton, first woman to serve as a Diplomatic Security special agent
 Lyle Overbay, baseball player
 Tavita Pritchard, American football coach
 Jimmy Ritchey, country music songwriter and record producer
 Detlef Schrempf, NBA player

Transportation
Amtrak, the national passenger rail system, provides service to Centralia station, stopping at the town's renovated 1912 railroad depot.  Amtrak train 11, the southbound Coast Starlight, is scheduled to depart Centralia at 11:45am with service to Kelso-Longview, Portland, Sacramento, Emeryville, California (with bus connection to San Francisco), and Los Angeles.  Amtrak train 14, the northbound Coast Starlight, is scheduled to depart Centralia at 5:57pm daily with service to Olympia-Lacey, Tacoma and Seattle.  Amtrak Cascades trains, operating as far north as Vancouver, British Columbia and as far south as Eugene, Oregon, serve Centralia several times daily in both directions. BNSF trains in Centralia's downtown rail yard and on the mainline serve local and regional shippers, but can affect the timeliness of Amtrak service and are a noisy reminder of the days of the town's heyday as the crossroads of four major railroads (Union Pacific, Milwaukee Road, Great Northern and Northern Pacific).

References

External links

 
Cities in Washington (state)
Cities in Lewis County, Washington
Industrial Workers of the World in Washington (state)
Populated places established in 1852
Superfund sites in Washington (state)
Micropolitan areas of Washington (state)
1852 establishments in Oregon Territory
Coal towns